Mikel Cee Karlsson (born 15 August 1977) is a Swedish film director. He has directed three feature-length documentaries as well as numerous music videos for artists like Fever Ray and Junip.  Mikel is known for his darkly absurd and often disturbing imagery.

Biography 

Mikel Cee Karlsson was born in 1977, in Varberg, Sweden. Mikel graduated from the School of Photography and Film, Gothenburg University in 2005. In addition to his three feature-length documentaries, he has directed numerous music videos for artists like Fever Ray, José González, The Amplifetes, The Perishers and Junip. Since 2007, Mikel is a part of the highly acclaimed Swedish production company Plattform Produktion (Involuntary 2008, Play 2011, Force Majeure 2014, The Square 2017). His award-winning first feature-length documentary Greetings From The Woods had its international premiere in competition in Locarno International Film Festival, 2009. His second documentary The Extraordinary Ordinary Life of José González premiered in competition at the 2010 edition of Göteborg International Film Festival and was also selected for Hot Docs in 2011. Cee Karlsson third feature length documentary Fraemling premiered in competition at CPH:DOX 2019, nominated in the DOX:Awards category.

Filmography

References

External links 
 Official site - Mikel Cee Karlsson
 Plattform Produktion
 Doc Alliance - Greetings from the woods (Online Documentary Cinema)

Swedish film directors
Swedish music video directors
1977 births
People from Varberg
Living people